Bebe Bettencourt (stylised as BeBe) (born 2 February 1996) is an Australian actress, known for playing Hedwig in the streaming service  Stan's Australian TV series Eden (2021) and  Eleanor "Ellie" Deacon in the film The Dry (2020).

Early life 
Bettencourt was born in 1996 in Sydney, Australia, the daughter of Nuno Bettencourt and Suze DeMarchi. She lived in Boston and Los Angeles as a child, before returning to Sydney. Currently she splits her time between LA and Sydney.

Career 
In 2020, Bettencourt made her feature film debut in The Dry; she starred along with Eric Bana. In 2021, Bettencourt appeared in the Stan television series Eden.

Filmography

Film

Television

References

External links 
 

Living people
1996 births
Actresses from Sydney
Australian film actresses
Australian television actresses